Sajeev Pazhoor (born 8 April 1974) is an Indian screenwriter, novelist and director in Malayalam cinema. He is known for his movie Thondimuthalum Driksakshiyum starring Fahadh Faasil and directed by Dileesh Pothan. He made his debut in Malayalam film industry with Swapaanam(2013) directed by Shaji N. Karun. He had scripted and directed more than 80 Documentary film.

Personal life
Sajeev Pazhoor was born in the village of Pazhoor, in  Ernakulam on 8 April 1974. He is the eldest son of P. K. Sankaran Nair and VishalakshiAmma. He received primary education from the Government L. P school Pazhoor and Government High School Piravom. He did his pre-university course and graduated in Malayalam Literature at Government College Manimalakunnu. He also secured Post Graduate Diploma in Journalism and started working as a sub-editor and later senior sub-editor in Deshabhimani daily. After his 19 years of service in Deshabhimani, he took voluntary retirement and started working as an  Assistant Information Officer in the Department of Information and Public Relations, Government of Kerala. Currently, he is working as the Assistant Cultural Development Officer at the same.

Career
His debut documentary Agnisakshiyude Sakshi brought him State television Award for best Documentary Director(2003). After that, he directed and scripted almost hundreds of documentaries and ten short stories. Later in 2014, he won the State Award for the Best Documentary Director. He entered the Malayalam film industry as an assistant director and later associate director under Shaji.N.Karun. He made his debut in the screenplay arena through Shaji .N.Karun's movie Swaapanam. He also worked with Lenin Rajendran and Sanjeev Shivan as associate director. He wrote the screenplay for the movie Swayam directed by R. Sarath. Meanwhile, he worked as associate director and script editor of many movies in the Kokborok language. Of which the movie Yarwng received a National Film Award for the best feature movie in Kokborok. He wrote the story, screenplay and dialogue for Thondimuthalum Driksakshiyum directed by Dileesh Pothan that has won various awards.. He won the Kerala State Award for Best Scriptwriter in 2017 for the movie.  He worked for the movie Sathyam Paranga Viswasikumo  by Prajith Karanavar. His upcoming movie is Kesu E Veedinte Nadhan  directed by Nadirshah, starring Dileep & Urvashi.

Short Film/Documentary Film

Feature Film

Awards

References 

 In conversation with Sajeev Pazhoor, this year’s National Award winner for original screenplay
Urvashi to Lead Opposite Indrans
Sajeev Pazhoor’s Short Fiction Film ‘Choodu’
 Fahadh with Dileesh Pothen again
 Biju Menon’s signs realistic thriller with G Prajith?
 Director B Unnikrishnan’s is prepping up for his next venture with Suraj Venjaramoodu as lead
 48th Kerala State Film Awards

External links

Malayalam screenwriters
Living people
1974 births
Malayalam film directors
Screenwriters from Kochi
Best Original Screenplay National Film Award winners